Constance Nevlin Johnson (born May 11, 1952) is an American politician from the U.S. state of Oklahoma. She served in the Oklahoma Senate, representing District 48, which encompasses portions of northeastern and northwestern Oklahoma County until 2014. She was first elected to the state senate in a special election in September 2005.

Johnson became the first African American woman nominated for a major statewide office in Oklahoma and the first woman US Senate nominee from Oklahoma of any party when she won the Democratic primary run-off of the 2014 U.S. Senate election. She ran for Governor of Oklahoma in 2018 and 2022, losing in the Democratic primary both times.

Johnson is a member of the Democratic Socialists of America.

Early life and education
Born in Holdenville, Oklahoma, in 1952, she graduated from Frederick A. Douglass High School in Oklahoma City and earned a bachelor's degree in French from the University of Pennsylvania, where she also completed coursework for a Masters of Science in Education. After college she worked for the Oklahoma Community Action Director's Association, the Comprehensive Employment and Training Act (CETA) within the City of Oklahoma City, and as the personnel assistant within the General Administrator's office of the Oklahoma Corporation Commission. She graduated from Langston University's master's in Rehabilitation Counseling Program and holds a doctorate in political science from Larry Love University.

Career in the Oklahoma State Senate
Johnson worked for the Oklahoma State Senate as a legislative analyst from 1981 to 2005 when she won the Senate seat representing District 48 in a special election. She was re-elected in 2006 and 2010.

Senate committees
 Chair, Committee on Select Agencies
 Co-Chair, Criminal Jurisprudence Committee
 Full Appropriations
 Appropriations Subcommittee on Health & Human Services
 Appropriations Subcommittee on General Government and Transportation
 Health and Human Services
 Transportation
 Veterans and Military Affairs
 Energy
 Finance
 Rules
 General Government

Stance on Senate Bill 1433
Senate Bill 1433, which sought to define human life as beginning at fertilization, would have offered full legal protection to all human embryos. In the words of the bill, “the unborn child at every stage of development (has) all the rights, privileges, and immunities available to other persons, citizens, and residents of this state.” Johnson submitted an amendment of her own to the bill, which would have added the words:
 
However, any action in which a man ejaculates or otherwise deposits semen anywhere but in a woman’s vagina shall be interpreted and construed as an action against an unborn child.

She explained that the amendment was intended to "draw attention to the absurdity, duplicity and lack of balance inherent in the policies of this state in regard to women". Her efforts were used as part of a skit that was featured on the Daily Show with Jon Stewart entitled "Bro Choice," and, in conjunction with a rally organized by the newly created Oklahoma Coalition for Reproductive Justice, led to the defeat of the proposed legislation. At the rally, Johnson was joined by fellow state senator Judy Eason McIntyre, who was pictured holding up a protest sign that read "If I wanted the government in my womb, I'd fuck a senator."

Campaign for U.S. Senate
On April 8, 2014, Johnson announced she was running in the 2014 United States Senate special election in Oklahoma. Johnson faced Patrick Hayes and perennial candidate Jim Rogers.  Johnson finished first in the Democratic primary with a plurality, and faced Rogers in a runoff election. Rogers had an advantage with name recognition heading into the runoff election, having appeared numerous times on the ballot in Oklahoma. Johnson, having spent 8 years in the Oklahoma State Senate as an outspoken critic of the Republican legislature, was able to acquire experienced campaign staff to secure a runoff election victory. Controversy would later surround a successful lawsuit with Johnson staff member Rico Smith. Smith filed a suit claiming Johnson did not properly pay him according to a contract signed by Johnson's  campaign staff. That suit was sustained by the court. Campaign Manager Bailey Perkins, succeeded by Colletta Harper, along with Communications Director James Cooper, an Oklahoma City journalist and professor, and Political Director David Roberts, a veteran political operative and former 2008 Obama for America staff member rounded out the organizational structure. Rogers' name recognition did little to combat Johnson's growing notoriety and campaign organization. Johnson won the runoff election, defeating Rogers by 14 percentage points, to face Rep. James Lankford in the general election campaign. Johnson lost the election for the unexpired term of Tom Coburn to James Lankford, by a margin of 237,923 29.0% to Lankford's 557,002, 67.9%, with independent candidate Mark Beard collecting 25,965 votes, 3.2% of the total. Oklahoma had the lowest voter turnout in the country in the 2014 midterm elections with only 29% of registered voters casting a ballot.

Comprehensive marijuana reform
Johnson introduced legislation legalizing medical marijuana in 2007, and each subsequent session, in conjunction with efforts to change Oklahoma's harsh sentencing guidelines. In June 2014, Senator Johnson and attorney David Slane announced the filing of an initiative petition for a proposed amendment to the Constitution of Oklahoma which would legalize the possession of up to one ounce of recreational marijuana and three ounces of medical marijuana. According to Johnson, "We’re putting forth Genesis 1:29 as the basis of this campaign. God created this wonderful, miraculous plant and we know that it has been vilified for the last 100 years, and it’s time to change that in Oklahoma." While the petition drive for the 2014 effort failed, Johnson has continued to work towards marijuana reform. She assisted with the petition to place SQ 788 legalizing medical marijuana on the ballot in 2018, and circulated a full legalization petition focused on use for agricultural, medicinal and recreational purposes.

Death penalty reform 
Elected to chair the Oklahoma Coalition to Abolish the Death Penalty (OK-CADP) in 2015 and again in 2016, Johnson led the Say No To SQ 776/Think Twice Oklahoma campaign to keep the death penalty out of Oklahoma's state constitution. While the state question was predicted to pass with overwhelming support, the "Say No" effort successfully kept the win margin at 66%, vs the projected 75%, via an advocacy and education campaign that focused on conservative fiscal concerns.

Work with the Oklahoma Democratic Party 
Johnson was elected vice chair of the Oklahoma Democratic Party (ODP) in May 2015 based on her belief that the party should do more to increase voting participation using specific voting strategies and more voter education. She supported the decision to allow Independents to participate in the Democratic Primary and has worked to re-invigorate the process for clubs representing diverse groups to have a voice on the ODP Central Committee. She was the whistle blower on a gag order that prohibited Democrats from discussing key Democratic issues such as women's reproductive health rights, immigration, death penalty abolition, and marijuana policy reform. Johnson was the only super delegate from Oklahoma to support Sen. Bernie Sanders at the Democratic National Convention. Senator Sanders won Oklahoma by 10+ percentage points, and carried 75 of 77 counties in the Oklahoma Democratic Primary in 2016.

Oklahoma gubernatorial campaigns

2018 
Johnson ran unsuccessfully for the Democratic nomination for Governor of Oklahoma in 2018. She won 38.6% of votes to elect a Democratic candidate for governor in the Oklahoma statewide primary held on June 26, 2018, losing to former Oklahoma attorney general Drew Edmondson who won 61.4% of votes.

2022 
On May 17, 2021, Johnson filed to run for Governor once again in 2022, to challenge Republican incumbent Kevin Stitt. On June 28, 2022, Johnson lost the Democratic primary to Oklahoma Superintendent of Public Instruction Joy Hofmeister.

See also
List of Democratic Socialists of America who have held office in the United States

References

External links

Campaign website
Constance N. Johnson (OK) at Project Vote Smart 
Oklahoma Democratic Party (ODP) 
Oklahoma Coalition to Abolish the Death Penalty 
Women of the Oklahoma Legislature Oral History Collection
 

1952 births
20th-century African-American people
20th-century African-American women
21st-century African-American women
21st-century African-American politicians
21st-century American politicians
21st-century American women politicians
African-American state legislators in Oklahoma
Candidates in the 2014 United States elections
Candidates in the 2018 United States elections
Candidates in the 2022 United States elections
Cannabis law reform in the United States
Living people
Democratic Party Oklahoma state senators
Democratic Socialists of America politicians from Oklahoma
People from Holdenville, Oklahoma
Women state legislators in Oklahoma